Alexandros Nikolias (born 23 July 1994) is a Greek professional footballer who plays as a winger for Super League 2 club AEL.

Honours 
PAS Giannina
Super League 2: 2019–20

References

External links
Scoresway Profile
Onsports.gr Profile

1994 births
Living people
Greek footballers
Super League Greece players
Super League Greece 2 players
Football League (Greece) players
AEK Athens F.C. players
A.O. Glyfada players
Olympiacos Volos F.C. players
PAS Giannina F.C. players
Olympiacos F.C. players
Athlitiki Enosi Larissa F.C. players
Association football forwards
Footballers from Central Greece
People from Euboea (regional unit)